Rasmus Ojemaye (born 28 May 1969) is a Nigerian former boxer. He competed in the men's heavyweight event at the 2000 Summer Olympics. Ojemaye's last competitive boxing match occurred on May 8th, 2002, at the Equinox Nightclub in Leicester Square, London, United Kingdom.

References

External links
 
 

1969 births
Living people
Nigerian male boxers
Olympic boxers of Nigeria
Boxers at the 2000 Summer Olympics
Commonwealth Games silver medallists for Nigeria
Commonwealth Games medallists in boxing
Boxers at the 1994 Commonwealth Games
Heavyweight boxers
Medallists at the 1994 Commonwealth Games